Upsilon Aquarii, Latinized from υ Aquarii, is the Bayer designation for a binary star system in the equatorial constellation of Aquarius. It is visible to the naked eye as a faint star with an apparent visual magnitude of 5.21. This is a high proper-motion star that is drifting closer to the Sun with a radial velocity of –2.3 km/s. It is part of the Hercules-Lyra association.

The primary component is an F-type main sequence star with a stellar classification of F7 V. It is less than a billion years old and is spinning with a projected rotational velocity of 35 km/s. The star has 1.4 times the mass of the Sun and 1.5 times the Sun's radius. It is radiating 3.6 times the Sun's luminosity from its photosphere at an effective temperature of 6,597 K, giving it the yellow-white hue of an F-type star.

The star displays an excess of near infrared radiation, suggesting it has a circumstellar disk of dusty debris. The debris disk is orbiting close to the dynamically unstable region of this system.

References

External links
 Image Upsilon Aquarii

F-type main-sequence stars
Circumstellar disks
Binary stars

Aquarius (constellation)
Aquarii, Upsilon
BD-21 6251
Aquarii, 059
0863.2
213845
111449
8592